The Badlands Guardian  is a geomorphological feature located near Medicine Hat in the southeast corner of Alberta, Canada. The feature was discovered in 2005 by Lynn Hickox through use of Google Earth.

Description
Viewed from the air, the feature has been said to resemble a human head wearing a full Indigenous type of headdress, facing directly westward. Additional human-made structures have been said to resemble a pair of earphones worn by the figure. The apparent earphones are a road (Township Road 123A) and an oil well, which were installed in the early 2000s and are expected to disappear once the project is abandoned. 

The head is a drainage feature created through erosion of soft, clay-rich soil by the action of wind and water.
The arid badlands are typified by infrequent but intense rain-showers, sparse vegetation and soft sediments. The 'head' may have been created during a short period of fast erosion immediately following intense rainfall. Although the image appears to be a convex feature, it is actually concave – that is, a valley, which is formed by erosion on a stratum of clay, and is an instance of the Hollow-Face illusion. Its age is estimated to be in the hundreds of years at a minimum.

In 2006, suitable names were canvassed by CBC Radio One program As It Happens. Out of 50 names submitted, seven were suggested to the Cypress County Council. They altered the suggested 'Guardian of the Badlands' to become Badlands Guardian.

The Badlands Guardian was also described by the Sydney Morning Herald as a "net sensation". PCWorld magazine has referred to the formation as a "geological marvel". It is listed as the seventh of the top ten Google Earth finds by Time magazine.

See also
 Apophenia, the tendency to perceive connections between unrelated things
 Pareidolia, the phenomenon of perceiving faces in random patterns
 "Face on Mars", photographed by Viking 1 in 1976
 Inuksuk, traditional Native Arctic peoples' stone "marker statuaries" in Alaska and Arctic Canada
 Marcahuasi, a plateau in the Andes, near Lima, Peru with numerous rock formations with surprising likenesses to specific animals, people, and religious symbols.
 Old Man of the Mountain, (former) rock profile in New Hampshire (collapsed on May 3, 2003)
 Old Man of Hoy, a rock pillar off Scotland that resembles a standing man

References

External links
 Satellite image (Google Maps)
 Photo of the Badlands Guardian taken from a paraglider
 3D diagram of Badlands Guardian topography, prepared by Lutz Perschon for CBC Radio. 
 Google Earth Community Page about the discovery of the feature.

Badlands of Canada
Cypress County
Geomorphology
Geology of Alberta
Landforms of Alberta